Jianggan District was one of ten urban districts of the prefecture-level city of Hangzhou, the capital of Zhejiang Province, East China. The district was located in the northeast of Hangzhou and on the northern (left) bank of the Qiantang River.

Hangzhou Jianqiao Airport is located in Jianqiao, Jianggan. Zhejiang Airlines once had its headquarters there.

Administrative divisions
Subdistricts:
Kaixuan Subdistrict (凯旋街道), Caihe Subdistrict (采荷街道), Zhanongkou Subdistrict (闸弄口街道), Sijiqing Subdistrict (四季青街道), Baiyang Subdistrict (白杨街道), Xiasha Subdistrict (下沙街道)

Towns:
Jiubao (九堡镇), Pengbu (彭埠镇), Dingqiao (丁桥镇), Jianqiao (笕桥镇)

References

Districts of Zhejiang
Geography of Hangzhou
Former districts of China